Ostrovnoy (masculine), Ostrovnaya (feminine), or Ostrovnoye (neuter) is the name of several inhabited localities in Russia:

Urban localities
Ostrovnoy, Murmansk Oblast, a closed town in Murmansk Oblast;

Rural localities
Ostrovnoy, Primorsky Krai (or Ostrovnoye), a selo in Krasnoarmeysky District of Primorsky Krai
Ostrovnoye, Altai Krai, a selo in Ostrovnovsky Selsoviet of Mamontovsky District in Altai Krai; 
Ostrovnoye, Chukotka Autonomous Okrug, a selo in Bilibinsky District of Chukotka Autonomous Okrug
Ostrovnoye, Kaliningrad Oblast, a settlement in Timiryazevsky Rural Okrug of Slavsky District in Kaliningrad Oblast
Ostrovnoye, Lebyazhyevsky District, Kurgan Oblast, a village in Lisyevsky Selsoviet of Lebyazhyevsky District in Kurgan Oblast; 
Ostrovnoye, Mishkinsky District, Kurgan Oblast (or Ostrovnaya), a selo in Ostrovninsky Selsoviet of Mishkinsky District in Kurgan Oblast; 
Ostrovnoye, Orenburg Oblast, a selo in Novocherkassky Selsoviet of Saraktashsky District in Orenburg Oblast
Ostrovnoye, Sverdlovsk Oblast, a settlement under the administrative jurisdiction of the City of Beryozovsky in Sverdlovsk Oblast
Ostrovnaya, Omsk Oblast, a village in Khutorsky Rural Okrug of Tyukalinsky District in Omsk Oblast;

See also
Mayak-Ostrovnoy (sometimes referred to as Ostrovnoy), a lighthouse classified as an inhabited locality in Lazovsky District of Primorsky Krai